Daniel McKeating (fourth  1910  – death unknown) was an English professional rugby league footballer who played in the 1930s and 1940s.

Background
Dan McKeating's birth was registered in Cockermouth district, Cumberland, England.

Playing career

International honours
Dan McKeating played  in British Empire XIII's 15–0 victory over France at Stade Buffalo, Paris on Monday 1 November 1937.

County honours
Dan McKeating represented Cumberland.

Challenge Cup Final appearances
Dan McKeating played  in Barrow's 4–7 defeat by Salford in the 1938 Challenge Cup Final during the 1937–38 season at Wembley Stadium, London on Saturday 7 May 1938.

County Cup Final appearances
Dan McKeating played  in Barrow's 4–8 defeat by Warrington in the 1937 Lancashire County Cup Final during the 1937–38 season at Central Park, Wigan on Saturday 23 October 1937.

Testimonial match
Dan McKeating's Testimonial matches at Barrow were shared with; Bob Ayres, Val Cumberbatch, John Higgin and William Little, and took place against Swinton on Saturday 27 April 1946, and against Oldham on Saturday 27 January 1947.

Contemporaneous article extract
"At present on Army service on the Continent, Dan McKeating came to Barrow from Whitehaven in 1932 and proved himself a great hooker. International and Cumberland County player. A top rank man who has given yeoman service to the Barrow Club."

Genealogical information
Dan McKeating was the older brother of the rugby league footballer; Vince McKeating.

References

1910 births
Barrow Raiders players
British Empire rugby league team players
Cumberland rugby league team players
English rugby league players
Rugby league players from Cockermouth
Place of death missing
Rugby league hookers
Year of death missing
British Army personnel of World War II